A pianist is someone who plays the piano.

Pianist or the pianist may also refer to:

Films and soundtracks
The Pianist (1991 film), a Canadian film directed by Claude Gagnon
The Pianist (1998 film), a Catalan-language film directed by Mario Gas, titled El Pianista in Catalan
The Piano Teacher (film), a French-language film by Michael Haneke, original title La Pianiste
The Pianist (2002 film), an English-language movie directed by Roman Polanski, based on Szpilman's memoir
The Pianist (soundtrack), the soundtrack to Polanski's 2002 film

Other arts, entertainment, and media
 The Pianist (album), an album by Duke Ellington
 The Pianist (memoir), by Władysław Szpilman, a Polish-Jewish musician who survived the Holocaust
 The Pianist (painting), a portrait of Stanley Addicks by Thomas Eakins
 Pianist (TV special), a 2010 South Korean single-episode drama